Michael Da'mond Morton (born February 6, 1960) is a former American football running back in the National Football League (NFL) for the Tampa Bay Buccaneers, the Washington Redskins, and the Seattle Seahawks.  He played college football at the University of Nevada, Las Vegas.

References

1960 births
Living people
American football running backs
Seattle Seahawks players
Tampa Bay Buccaneers players
UNLV Rebels football players
Washington Redskins players
Players of American football from Birmingham, Alabama
National Football League replacement players